Reid Bailey (born May 28, 1956) is a Canadian retired professional ice hockey defensemen who played three seasons in the National Hockey League (NHL) for the Philadelphia Flyers, Toronto Maple Leafs and Hartford Whalers.

Undrafted into the NHL, Bailey signed a free agent contract with the Philadelphia Flyers on November 20, 1978.

Career statistics

Regular season and playoffs

References

External links
 

1956 births
Binghamton Whalers players
Canadian ice hockey defencemen
Canadian people of British descent
Cornwall Royals (QMJHL) players
Hartford Whalers players
Kitchener Rangers players
Living people
Maine Mariners players
Moncton Alpines (AHL) players
Philadelphia Flyers players
Port Huron Flags players
Sault Ste. Marie Greyhounds players
Ice hockey people from Toronto
St. Catharines Saints players
Toronto Maple Leafs players
Undrafted National Hockey League players